An adhesive label or sticky label is a small piece of paper designed to be affixed to any surface, typically by the action of removing a layer of adhesive on the front or back of the label. The term adhesive refers to a sticky substance, while something that is self-adhesive implies that it will stick without wetting or the application of glue to the product.

One of the most familiar types of adhesive labels is the postage stamp, which was developed in Britain in the 1840s and became popular in the United States within the same decade. However, it was not until 1935, when R. Stanton Avery invented the machine to manufacture self-adhesive labels. Over time Avery's invention stimulated the development of eighteen original patents and revolutionized the way that manufacturers and brands advertised information on their products.

The machines Avery pioneered used a die-cutting process, allowing the paper to be cut into a repeated, specific shape, usually a rectangle or a square. In the 1960s, further innovations, increasing demand, and new kinds of adhesives were produced, and self-adhesive labels began to be manufactured on a large scale to a worldwide market. In the 1970s self-adhesive labels and stickers became mainstream products and were popularized in the form of car decals, bumper stickers, and collectable items.

There are three main classifications for label adhesives including: permanent, removable, and repositionable. Each variation has its own unique qualities and uses. The bond strength of each type of adhesive ranges from a strong bond which is permanent, to a flexible bond, which can be repositioned or removed entirely.

The growth, diversity, and popularity of self-adhesive labels have continued into the present day. Advancements in technology and demand for versatile products has led to more innovative materials being used to create more dynamic bonds which are specific to the environment they will be used in. Similarly, there are now a wide variety of materials that are used to create the face material, or front, of the labels. These products include polypropylene, polyester, vinyl, and mrPVC. Adhesive labels may now be produced individually, or in sheets, which case they are usually separated by perforations or rouletting, see postage stamp separation. Digital printing technology is also being used to improve this process. This innovative printing allows for customizable, print-on-demand products and has the capacity to lower costs for manufacturers worldwide. A recent article suggests that an increased consumer awareness paired with developments in technology will result in a strong future for adhesive labels.

The concept has since been extended into a variety of areas:

 On mail:airmail etiquettes, charity labels, address labels, return address labels, postage meter labels, certain types of postal labels
 On other kinds of paper objects:revenue stamps, savings stamps, general markers, notices, or warnings
 Retail products: decorations, stickers, barcodes, price labels, car decals, bumper stickers, and collectible items
 Industrial appliances: direction labels, warning labels
 On food: Nutritional information, allergy warnings, expiration dates
 On medical devices: prescription drug bottles, warning labels, brand information

Almost every imaginable combination of paper products and adhesives have been used at some point to create adhesive labels; see postage stamp paper and postage stamp gum for a more detailed discussion. See postage stamp separation.

See also 
 Gutter (philately)
 Label (philately)

Notes

External links 

 The history of self adhesive labels, WorldLabel.com
 THE HISTORY OF SELF ADHESIVE LABELS, Etiquette.co.uk

Stationery
Philatelic terminology